Fui Sha Wai is a walled village in Tai Hang, Tai Po District, Hong Kong.

Administration
Fui Sha Wai is one of the villages represented within the Tai Po Rural Committee. For electoral purposes, Fui Sha Wai is part of the Lam Tsuen Valley constituency, which was formerly represented by Richard Chan Chun-chit until October 2021.

History
At the time of the 1911 census, the population of Tai Hang Fui Sha Wai was 117. The number of males was 47.

Conservation
The enclosing walls of Fui Sha Wai have been listed as Grade III historic buildings.

See also
 Walled villages of Hong Kong
 Chung Sum Wai (Tai Hang), an nearby walled village in Tai Hang

References

External links

 Delineation of area of existing village Tai Hang (Tai Po) for election of resident representative (2019 to 2022) (includes Fui Sha Wai)
 Antiquities Advisory Board. Historic Building Appraisal. Enclosing Walls and Entrance Gate, Fui Sha Wai Pictures of the enclosing walls Pictures of the entrance gate

Villages in Tai Po District, Hong Kong
Walled villages of Hong Kong